Rubiel Quintana (born June 26, 1978) is a Colombian former footballer that played for clubs from Colombia, Argentina and Turkey.

Titles
 América de Cali 2000 (Colombian League)

External links
 Rubiel Quintana at BDFA.com.ar 

1973 births
Living people
Colombian footballers
Colombia international footballers
Categoría Primera A players
Cortuluá footballers
América de Cali footballers
Deportivo Cali footballers
Club Atlético Belgrano footballers
Çaykur Rizespor footballers
Atlético Huila footballers
Unión Magdalena footballers
Envigado F.C. players
Monagas S.C. players
Boyacá Chicó F.C. footballers
Deportivo Pereira footballers
Süper Lig players
Colombian expatriate footballers
Expatriate footballers in Argentina
Expatriate footballers in Turkey
Expatriate footballers in Venezuela
Association football defenders
Footballers from Cali